Homeshare (also called sharehome) is the exchange of housing for help in the home. A householder, typically an older person with a spare room, offers free or low-cost accommodation to another person in exchange for an agreed level of support. The support may include companionship, shopping, household tasks, gardening, care of pets and, increasingly, help to use the computer. Homeshare thus provides a solution to the needs of two groups of people - those in need of affordable housing, often younger people, and those in need of some support to live at home, usually older people. Homeshare programmes, many run by voluntary bodies, have taken root in at least thirteen countries worldwide, some of them with public funding.

Who benefits from homeshare and how? 
Homeshare was originally set up to benefit older people who needed support to live independently, but the concept is flexible and can be adapted to meet local needs and circumstances. Homeshare is directly benefiting many people across the globe, including:

People with disabilities or support needs, of all ages
single parents who need help with child care
Students who need low-cost accommodation
Young people and key workers (such as nurses, police officers, teachers) who are priced out of the housing market
Students from overseas, living with a host offers the chance to improve their English language skills.

The direct benefits to a Householder include; help with daily living, companionship and the security of having someone in the house, especially at night. There are even recorded instances of homesharers saving lives; for example a German homesharer called the emergency services when the householder had a heart attack. Other benefits include: breaking down the barriers between generations and different cultures, fostering mutual understanding and tolerance. For instance, in an Australian program, an elderly Italian lady successfully shared her home with a Pakistani Muslim homesharer.

Others benefit indirectly. Families of Householders speak of the reassurance that their loved one has someone in the house, looking out for their welfare. Public services benefit too, as homeshare can delay the need for costly services such as residential care.

The following case study from the UK indicates how homeshare can benefit an older and a younger person.

Josie, in her mid-70s, was referred to a homeshare programme by a hospital after a stroke severely affected her behaviour. The hospital was keen to discharge her if home support could be arranged. She was found a perfect match in Trevor, a young working man who needed accommodation and who handled Josie’s erratic ways with great diplomacy. Soon Josie adored him like a grandson and, keen to cook for him, regained all her independence skills. Trevor stayed with her for three years by which time Josie was well enough to live alone again.

How homeshare works 
Homeshare programmes are diverse in terms of how they operate. Some are run on a ‘counselling’ model, whereby programme coordinators screen potential candidates, match them skilfully, negotiate a contract, monitor the outcome and provide ongoing support to both parties (called ‘match-up programs’ in the USA). Others are run on the ‘referral’ model, where the programme coordinators interview applicants and suggest matches, and it is then up to the applicants to take the arrangements forward. Many USA programs offer both approaches.

Homeshare is usually seen as a free exchange of services, though in some programmes, such as Cohabilis or ensemble2generations in France, Homesharers pay a modest rent for their room. Typically the Homesharers get free accommodation however and in return offer a specified number of hours of support: ten hours per week in the UK is usual, while in Germany the hours of support are related to the size of the Homesharer's room. Either or both applicants may pay a fee to the Homeshare programme to cover administrative, marketing and monitoring costs.

The history of homeshare 
Homeshare has its roots in the USA where the late Maggie Kuhn (founder of the Gray Panthers) set up the first programs in 1972. In the UK, homeshare was taken up in the early 1980s by the late Nan Maitland, who in 1993 launched the first formal programme, in London. In Europe, it is believed that the concept of homeshare was invented quite independently in Spain, where, in 1991 the Alojamiento por Compañia programme was set up in Granada to meet an urgent need for student accommodation. By 1992 the idea had been adopted in Germany where the award-winning Wohnen für Hilfe programme was founded by Professor Anne-Lotte Kreickemeier in Darmstadt, again to meet the need for student accommodation. There are now several programmes in Germany. In France, ensemble2generations, founded in 2006 in the Paris area, is now spreading to other parts of the country.

In 1999 Nan Maitland went on to launch Homeshare International (HI). Homeshare programmes in Sydney and Melbourne, Australia, were launched in 2000 as a direct result of Homeshare International's work.

The concept has now been adopted in many parts of the world. There have been failures too – in Israel and the Czech Republic in the 1990s for example.

Homeshare and the public policy agenda 
Homeshare fits well with the policy agendas of many different countries, where it:
 supports older people in their own homes for longer, delaying or preventing the need for costly residential care (see for example the  Ben Carstein (2003) evaluation, detailed below)
 enables hospital discharge and prevents ‘bed-blocking’
 is a simple solution: "The consistency and simplicity of a single homesharer is ‘heaven sent’ compared with the typical highly-complex package of care for older people" (quoted from the report by Patricia Thornton, see below)
 makes better use of housing stock – many older householders are ‘under-occupying’ their homes
 provides affordable housing for key workers in expensive cities like London, UK
 provides low-cost accommodation for students, primarily in mainland Europe, where universities have increased their intake faster than their student housing programmes
 tackles loneliness by facilitating sociable living
 could contribute to intergenerational programmes, for examples see the Beth Johnson Foundation website
 contributes to strengthening local communities, such as promoted under the UK's Putting People First agenda

Despite the fact that homeshare meets so many policy aims, public authorities have been slow to adopt it. Some programmes are funded by government, for example in Australia, but others struggle with little or no public financial backing. In part this may be policy makers’ lack of awareness, but another factor may be the perceived risk of homeshare. In the UK for example, policy makers are wary of enabling strangers to move in with vulnerable older people, even though there is no single documented case of abuse taking place. The cost of running homeshare programmes may be another factor that limits the spread of the idea, though there is ample evidence that homeshare can be very cost effective in meeting the needs of older people (see Carstein (2003), below).

Homeshare International and other umbrella organisations 
Homeshare International was set up in 1999 to:
 raise awareness of homeshare and its potential contribution to public policy
 foster new programmes round the world
 encourage and support ‘good practices’
 encourage practitioners to exchange learning, ideas and information
 stimulate research into the benefits of homeshare
 provide working tools for homeshare practitioners

Run entirely by volunteers, Homeshare International runs a multi-lingual website, which is a major resource for practitioners, publishes a directory of known programmes (also on the website) and runs biennial conferences to enable people to meet and share experiences and learning.

In the UK, Homeshare UK (part of Shared Lives Plus, formerly NAAPS (National Association of Adult Placement Services)) supports the promotion and development of Homeshare schemes in the UK and ROI , with a membership of the 23 Homeshare programmes. In the US, many homeshare programmes are affiliated with the National Shared Housing Resource Center.

Notes

Carstein, Ben (2003) Economic evaluation of Homeshare Victoria. Melbourne, Homeshare Victoria
Coffey, Jane (2010) An Evaluation of Homeshare Pilot Programmes in West Sussex, Oxfordshire and Wiltshire. Oxford, Oxford Brookes University (available on the University's website)
Elton, Brian, Nelson, Penny and Gerner, Kym (2001) Progress Review of Homeshare NSW. NSW, The Benevolent Society
Head, Helen and Symanowicz, Stacey Z (1997) A Vermonter’s Guide to Homesharing. Vermont, Project Home
Jaffe, Dale J, editor (1989) Shared housing for the elderly. Contributions to the Study of Aging, no. 15. New York and London, Greenwood Press.
A series of papers on homeshare in the US and Canada
Johnson, Sue and McAdam, Helen (2000) Homesharing : A review of Australian and International Projects. Victoria, The Creative Skill Consultants
Kreickemeier, Anne-Lotte, Román, Asunción M, Bradley, Rhian, Maitland, Nan, Murcia, Joaquina and Redero, Hortensia (2001) Homeshare Europe. Alicante, University of Alicante
Martin Bonato & Associates Pty Ltd (2002) Cost and Benefit Analysis of the Homeshare Victoria Pilot Scheme. Melbourne, the Associates
Montague, Meg (2001) An evaluation of Homeshare Victoria Pilot Phase I: planning, implementation and the first year of matches. Melbourne, Homeshare Victoria
NAAPS (2011) Homeshare good practice guide – available on the 
Thornton, Patricia (1995) The Homeshare Project: report to the Community Care Trust of a study carried out by the Social Policy Research Unit [University of York], Community Care Trust: London
Wren, Toni (2006) Homeshare NSW: Analysis of the Previous Business Model and Recommendations for a Refined Model: a report for The Benevolent Society and Social Ventures Australia. NSW, Cuttagee Consulting

Social programs
Housing for the elderly